Ali Ekrem Bolayır (1867 – 1937) was a Turkish politician and former governor of Jerusalem during the Ottoman period. He was an early key member of both the Turkish National Movement and the CHP. He was the son of Namık Kemal.

References

1867 births
1937 deaths
Politicians from Istanbul
Governors of the Ottoman Empire
Republican People's Party (Turkey) politicians
20th-century Turkish politicians
Turkish nationalists